Obolon' crater  is a  diameter buried meteorite impact crater situated about  southeast of Kyiv in Ukraine (Poltava Oblast).
The site has been drilled, which revealed the presence of shocked minerals and impact melt rock; the high chlorine content of the latter suggesting that the area was covered by shallow sea at the time of impact.
One estimate puts the age at 169 ± 7 million years (Middle Jurassic).

Hypothetical multiple impact event 

It has been suggested by Geophysicist David Rowley of the University of Chicago, working with John Spray of the University of New Brunswick and Simon Kelley of the Open University, that Obolon' may have been part of a hypothetical multiple impact event which also formed the Manicouagan impact structure in northern Quebec, Rochechouart impact structure in France, Saint Martin crater in Manitoba, and Red Wing crater in North Dakota. All of the craters had previously been known and studied, but their paleoalignment had never before been demonstrated. Rowley has said that the likelihood that these craters could be aligned like this due to chance is nearly zero.

References 

Impact craters of Ukraine
Jurassic impact craters
Geography of Poltava Oblast